Fritz Danild (18 August 1893 – 10 March 1951) was a Danish athlete. He competed in the men's individual cross country event at the 1912 Summer Olympics.

References

1893 births
1951 deaths
Athletes (track and field) at the 1912 Summer Olympics
Danish male long-distance runners
Olympic athletes of Denmark
Athletes from Copenhagen
Olympic cross country runners